That Was Then... This Is Now is a 1985 American drama film based on the novel of the same name by S. E. Hinton. The film was directed by Christopher Cain, distributed by Paramount Pictures, and stars Emilio Estevez (who also wrote the screenplay) and Craig Sheffer.

Synopsis
Troubled teen Mark Jennings has always looked up to his older friend, Bryon Douglas, who Mark sees as the older brother he never had. But when Bryon starts dating Cathy Carlson and begins to act more responsible, Mark feels left out. Without Bryon's stabilizing influence, Mark begins acting out and gets into dealing drugs. After the friends' mentor Charlie Woods suddenly dies and Cathy's brother goes missing, Bryon suspects Mark is involved.

Cast
 Craig Sheffer as Bryon Douglas
 Emilio Estevez as Mark Jennings
 Jill Schoelen as Angela Shepard
 Larry B. Scott as Terry Jones
 Kim Delaney as Cathy Carlson
 Barbara Babcock as Mrs. Douglas
 Frank Howard as M&M Carlson
 Morgan Freeman as Charlie Woods
 Francis X. McCarthy as Mr. Carlson
 Diane Dorsey as Mrs. Carlson
 Ramon Estevez AKA Ramon Sheen as Mike Chambers
 Dan Lyon as "Car" Guy
 Sharon Thomas as Doctor

Production
In 1982, Emilo Estevez starred in the film version of S.E. Hinton's Tex. During filming, Estevez read That Was Then, This Is Now, also by Hinton, and enjoyed the book so much he drafted several screenplays before purchasing the rights. Estevez described the book as "a very intense, dark piece. It's kind of like the old Pat O'Brien-Jimmy Cagney movies where O'Brien becomes the priest and Cagney becomes the gangster". Estevez did a rewrite of the film during the making of The Breakfast Club, staying up all night to write after the typical 12 hour filming day. After speaking with Hinton, who recommended he also play one of the characters, Estevez attempted to sell the screenplay, but studios were reluctant.

Estevez' father Martin Sheen bought the rights to That Was Then, This Is Now in 1982. "I knew it would be hot", said Estevez of the novel, who said in 1983 he wanted to star along with Tom Cruise. Estevez found two Midwest producers interested in making the film and they succeeded in raising the finance. One of them, Gary Lindberg, ran a production company that mostly made TV commercials, based in Minnesota. The film was shot in the summer of 1984 in St. Paul, Minnesota, without a distributor. It was later advertised as "the first Minnesota movie".

Sheen recommended his son play Bryon Douglas, but Estevez, wary of being typecast, chose to play what he saw as the "sympathetic bad guy". Estevez said: "There's probably a lot of him in me, the alter ego screaming to get out every once in a while. Fortunately, I was able to vent it in a film and not in real life".

Estevez said that they have been able to learn from the other Hinton adaptations: "We made it very contemporary, hired a brilliant cinematographer. The cast is primarily unknowns so it has a real feel – you're not watching movie stars. The emotional content is so rich, so full, it's absolutely draining. It's a terrific movie".

Reception
The film opened November 8, 1985 and finished sixth place for the weekend with a gross of $2,502,780, behind other openers such as Target and Translyvania 6-5000. It was a minor success at the box office, grossing $8.6 million.

On Rotten Tomatoes the film holds a 0% rating based on 5 reviews. On Metacritic it has a score of 45% based on reviews from 6 critics, indicating "mixed or average reviews".

Home Media
That Was Then... This Is Now was released on VHS by Paramount Home Video in 1986.

References

External links
 
 
 

1980s coming-of-age drama films
1985 films
American coming-of-age drama films
Films about drugs
Films based on American novels
Films set in the 1960s
Films shot in Minnesota
Paramount Pictures films
Films directed by Christopher Cain
1985 drama films
1980s English-language films
1980s American films